Ancient Methone, also called Thracian or Macedonian Methone to distinguish it from Messenian Methone was a polis in Ancient Greece, near the city of Pydna and the modern village of Nea Agathoupolis in Pieria. According to Plutarch, Methone was founded as a Greek colony in the year 733/732 BC. Methone gained special importance by the finding of labeled pottery and potsherds. It is one of the oldest testimonies of Greek writing and an important place in the history of Pieria.

Location
The ancient city of Methone was located on the northeastern shore of the Thermaic Gulf, in the northern Aegean in Greece. It was right on the sea, north of the modern town of Methoni. Due to the deposition of sediments, especially of the river Aliakmonas, the ancient village is now about 500 m distant from the coast. The archaeological remains of the city consist of buildings on the west and east hills and had a harbor. Around 700 BC the city had an area of about 20 hectares.

Mythology
In ancient sources, the figure of Methone is mentioned as one of the daughters of Alkyoneus. She is also known as the sister of Pierios, the founder of Pieria. According to Plutarch, the city was named after its founder, Methon, an ancestor of Orpheus. Another interpretation refers to the production and excessive consumption of wine.

History
The area around Methone was inhabited since the late Neolithic period (5000 BC to 3000 BC). From the late Bronze Age (1450 BC to 1100 BC), contacts of the inhabitants with the southern Aegean are documented; during the early Iron Age (11th to 8th centuries BC) the city was expanded.

Methone was founded in the second half of the 8th century BC of Eretrian settlers, who were previously evicted by Corinthian colonists from the island Corfu. Originally the settlers wanted after the expulsion from Corfu return to their hometown of Eretria on Euboea, but were prevented there by force of arms off the shore. Therefore, the Methonians were called by their neighbors  (roughly  the ones thrown away). 

The city is considered the oldest Greek colony in the northern Aegean. Due to the favorable location, it became a hub of trade with the Balkans. Since the founding of the colony, there existed production facilities for various goods and a trading port. In addition to the settlers from Euboea, local residents, Phoenicians and merchants from the eastern Aegean participated in the trade. The ports of Methone and Pydna reached 600 BC to 500 BC importance, especially in the shipment of timber and tar (shipbuilding).

Unlike the rest of Pieria, Methone was not ruled by Macedonia but was an ally of Athens and since 434 BC, a member of the Athenian League. The city was besieged by the Macedonian king Philip II, who thereby lost his eye by an arrow (354/3 BC). After their surrender King Philip allowed the inhabitants to leave the city. However, they were not allowed to take their belongings, only the clothes they wore were left to them. Methone was destroyed and has not been historically mentioned since.

It is probable that the apostle Paul resumed his second missionary mission to Athens from here, after leaving Berea (modern Veria) (Acts 17:14, 15).

Excavation history
Since 1972, the place of the ancient Methone was located. In 2003, excavation work began on the eastern hill, in 2006 on the western hill. They were executed under the direction of the archaeologist Matthaios Besios of the 27th Ephorate of Prehistoric and Classical Antiquity.

One problem that hinders the excavations is that most of the land belonging to the ancient city is privately owned. It is farmed so that many artifacts, which date from the 4th and 5th centuries BC, were destroyed. To carry out further excavations, this land must be purchased by the state. The exact location of the port is unknown. The Thermean Gulf extended then, until the beginning of the Byzantine era, to Pella, the capital of the Macedonian Empire. Later began the silting through the rivers Axios and Aliakmonas.

One of the most important finds was the exposure of the agora and its surrounding buildings on the west side of the eastern hill. The finds from the excavations of Methone, especially in the Ypogeio, contributed significantly to the research on the genesis and distribution of the Greek alphabet and its early use.

From 2013 to 2017, a team from UCLA (University of California, Los Angeles), led by Dr. Sarah Morris and Dr. John Papadopoulos took part at the excavations.

The results were published in 2012, funded by the European Union in the Education and Lifelong Learning program. In 2013, a book in Greek and English language was published to inform the public.

Excavations

Eastern hill
In the Neolithic, the eastern hill was wider, it was washed away from the sea over time. After the owner of the property had agreed, parts of the city were exposed. The found building remains date from 550 BC to 400 BC. It is an approximately 100 by 80 meters measuring area in the approximately four meters deep was dug. There was a smaller Agora surrounded by public buildings. Parts of a second place were found, so that the assumption is that instead of a central agora several smaller existed.

Ypogeio
The Ypogeio (cellar, here meeting basement, Greek Υπόγειο) is a more than 11 meters deep pit on the crest of the eastern hill. At the bottom it measures 3.60 m by 4.20 m. Presumably it was a storage room, which was not completed because of the instability of the hill. Around 700 BC the pit was then filled with wooden beams, stone molds for metal working, slag and potsherds. The ceramic remains come from different types of vessels. In addition to cookware, large amphorae and dinnerware, the remains of drinking vessels were found. The pottery came from different places of origin. In addition to local products, more were found in Phoenicia, Attica, Euboea, Cyclades and Ionia. The nature and period of manufacture confirm Plutarch's claim that Methone was founded around 733 BC. The rich finds indicate that Macedonia was not seen as a peripheral area of the Greek world.

Among the artifacts were 191 remnants of clay pots that were painted and / or bore markings or characters. Among them are 25 vessels that have been labeled with symbols and are partially provided with writings.They are among the oldest known texts written in the Greek alphabet and provide evidence for its adoption and development from the Phoenician alphabet. The inscriptions consist of engravings or brushstrokes and were usually applied before firing the ceramic. According to archaeologists, the various types of inscriptions, carefully or rather carelessly, indicate that the writing was not only the privilege of professional writers but also popular among the population. In addition to the name of the owner, phrases or small poems were also written on the ceramics. Most of the texts are written  from right to left (sinistrograde), but some are written from left to right (dextrograde) or alternate the direction of writing with each line (boustrophedon).

Western hill
This hill is slightly higher than the one to the east. The land on which was excavated belongs to the local school. Originally on the summit, since the late Bronze Age, the necropolis of the city was located. Around 900 BC the construction of buildings upon the necropolis began. This was done without taking care of the graves; the stone foundations of some houses even cut up the skeletons. The buildings themselves were built with bricks. The settlement was protected by a city wall. In order to improve their defense against enemies, a ditch was created outside the wall to actually increase the height of the wall. So far, three tunnels have been discovered that allowed the residents to leave the city. Presumably, in times of a siege, they served to create supplies to the city. Furthermore, kilns and remains of other crafts were found.

The army camp of Philip II was located about 500 meters south of the city.

References

Bibliography
 
 
 
 

Ancient Greek archaeological sites in Pieria
Populated places in ancient Pieria
Former populated places in Greece
Eretrian colonies